Hiram G. Andrews (September 12, 1876 – March 1968) was a Speaker of the Pennsylvania House of Representatives.  

Andrews was first elected to the Pennsylvania House of Representatives in 1933 and served through 1936. He was reelected in 1939 and completed his two-year term in 1940.  He was reelected for a third nonconsecutive tenure in 1945 and served in the Pennsylvania House through 1962, for a total of 24 years. 

There is a college named after him called the Hiram G. Andrews Center in Johnstown..  

Andrews was from Johnstown, Cambria County, Pennsylvania. 

1876 births
1968 deaths
Members of the Pennsylvania House of Representatives
Speakers of the Pennsylvania House of Representatives